Beladice is a village and municipality in Zlaté Moravce District of the Nitra Region, in western-central Slovakia. It is located in the lowhilled area and in the near of R1 expressway.

History
In historical records the village was first mentioned in 1156.

Geography
The municipality lies at an altitude of 170 metres and covers an area of 22.408 km2. It has a population of about 1525 people.

Ethnicity
The population is roughly 98.5% Slovak.

Facilities
The village has a small public library a gym and football pitch.

Genealogical resources

The records for genealogical research are available at the state archive "Statny Archiv in Nitra, Slovakia"

 Roman Catholic church records (births/marriages/deaths): 1697-1896 (parish B)
 Lutheran church records (births/marriages/deaths): 1827-1894 (parish B)
 Reformated church records (births/marriages/deaths): 1827-1895 (parish B)

See also
 List of municipalities and towns in Slovakia

External links
Official homepage
Surnames of living people in Beladice

Villages and municipalities in Zlaté Moravce District